Harrisburg 19th Street Armory is a historic National Guard armory located in Harrisburg, Dauphin County, Pennsylvania.  It was built in 1938, and is a two-story, stucco coated concrete building in the Moderne style. It has a modified "T"-plan, with administrative rooms and garage on the first floor and drill hall above.  An "L"-shaped addition dates to 1974.

It was added to the National Register of Historic Places in 1991.

References

Buildings and structures in Harrisburg, Pennsylvania
Armories on the National Register of Historic Places in Pennsylvania
Moderne architecture in Pennsylvania
Infrastructure completed in 1938
Buildings and structures in Dauphin County, Pennsylvania
National Register of Historic Places in Harrisburg, Pennsylvania